Tiki-taCAR is a South Korean television program that airs on SBS weekly on Sundays at 23:05 (KST) from April 4, 2021. The first season ended on June 19, 2021.

Format
The name of the program comes from Tiki-taka. The program is a new type of music talk show, where various celebrities who are currently the talks of the city are invited to board the specially designed bus. They engage in talks and sing songs together with the cast members on the bus, as these celebrities are brought to their destinations.

Cast
 Tak Jae-hoon
 Kim Gu-ra
 Eum Moon-suk
 Kyuhyun (Super Junior)

Episodes

Ratings
 The table below show the highest rating received in red, and the lowest rating in blue each year.
 The show will be aired in two parts. Only the higher rating of the two parts of each episode will be shown.

2021

Notes

References

External links

South Korean reality television series
2021 South Korean television series debuts
2021 South Korean television series endings
Seoul Broadcasting System original programming
Korean-language television shows
South Korean variety television shows